Calcio Foggia 1920, commonly referred to as Foggia, is an Italian football club based in Foggia, Apulia. It currently plays in Serie C, having last been in the top level Serie A in 1995.

The team gained nationwide popularity as Foggia Calcio in the 1990s when coached by Zdeněk Zeman because of its attacking, spectacular style of play, which brought Foggia continuously on the verge of UEFA Cup qualification, launching several players who later broke through at international level such as Giuseppe Signori, Francesco Baiano, Brian Roy, Igor Kolyvanov, Igor Shalimov, Roberto Rambaudi and Dan Petrescu. However, Foggia Calcio went bankrupt in 2004 and was replaced by U.S. Foggia, which itself was declared bankrupt in 2012.

On 23 April 2017, the club regained promotion to Serie B after a 19-year absence, but folded again only two years later, to restart from Serie D in 2019 as Calcio Foggia.

History

Foggia Calcio & U.S. Foggia

Foundation and early years

The club was founded in 1920 as Foggia Calcio. The club spent its early history playing football in the lower leagues, winning a championship in the dilettanti in 1933.

In 1957–58, a merger took place between Foggia Calcio and Foggia Incedit, forming Unione Sportiva Foggia as the club is today. In 1961–62, the team was taken over by President Domenico Rosa Rosa, a wood industrialist, and coach Oronzo Pugliese, who quickly led them to promotion to Serie B.

Reaching Serie A
History was made in the 1963–64 season, when Rosa Rosa and Oronzo Pugliese's Foggia reached Serie A for the first time. From 1964–65, Foggia managed to compete in three consecutive seasons in the top flight. On 31 January 1965, still under the guidance of coach Pugliese, Foggia recorded a historic 3–2 victory against Inter, who were at the time led by manager Helenio Herrera. The season was crowned by the national call-ups of Micelli and Nocera who played for Italy against Wales. Italy won 4–1 and Nocera managed to get on the scoresheet. At the end of the season, Pugliese left to take charge of Roma.

Pugliese was replaced by Egizio Rubino, and Foggia, although with more difficulty compared to the previous season, managed to survive the drop again. The following year, however, Foggia was relegated. It was a forgettable championship, after 10 matches Foggia had collected only three points and scored just 24 goals. Rubino was sacked and replaced by Bonazzini. The team improved under Bonazzini but failed to avoid relegation. At the end of the season, president Rosa Rosa also left the club, following their relegation.

Relegated at the end of the 1966–67 season, Foggia returned to the top flight in 1970–71, with Tommaso Maestrelli on the bench. Maestrelli would later win the 1973–74 scudetto with Lazio. Luigi Del Neri was, at the time, a Foggia player. The club was relegated again and returned to Serie A in 1973–74, before another relegation which came after a 6-point deduction for alleged corruption relating to the referee of a home match against Milan. The coach that season was Lauro Toneatto. Foggia played two more seasons in Serie A in 1976–77 and in 1977–78, when they were once more relegated to Serie B.

Glory years and Zemanlandia 
Following their relegation back to Serie B, Foggia were then dealt with a further blow with relegation to Serie C. They battled their way in Serie C1 throughout much of the 1980s. This was a particularly tough time for Foggia as their regional rivals, Bari, Lecce, Barletta and Taranto were all playing at higher levels.

In 1989, with the appointment of Czech coach Zdeněk Zeman, the club began to enter the greatest period in its history. The aggressive and entertaining football of the Bohemian coach was based on a 4–3–3 formation. Pressure, offside tactics and frenetic movement of both players and the ball made up the trademark style of Zeman's Foggia. The club first returned to Serie B, and then the following season in 1990–91, they won the Serie B by a large margin and returned to Serie A.

After returning to Serie A in the 1991–92 season, Foggia dei Miracoli, as they were known, proved to be competitive with any opponent and was appreciated by the press because of the attractive football they played. The term Zemanlandia was then coined to indicate the style created by Zeman, and became strictly associated to the Foggia team of the 1990s. The Foggia team also featured star players, especially attacking trio of Giuseppe Signori, Francesco Baiano and Roberto Rambaudi, as well as Russian star Igor Shalimov. That season, Foggia achieved the amazing feat of scoring 58 goals while also conceding 58. Foggia soon lost many of these quality players, including their three key forwards, and had to replace them with young talent. The club completed three Serie A campaigns finishing mid-table. In Serie A 1993-94, Foggia's football continued but the depleted squad was no longer as competitive and the club was relegated back to Serie B in 1995.

Zeman left to join Lazio at the end of that season, marking the end of Zemanlandia whilst the club was beset with financial problems. The Foggia glory days had come to an end.

Decline, Serie C and Zeman's return
Following the drop, Foggia spent two seasons in Serie B achieving mid-table finishes, before another relegation followed at the end of the 1997–98 season. They did not fare any better down in Serie C1, with another successive relegation to Serie C2.

Playing football in Italy's fourth tier was far less glamorous than the Zemanlandia days but the club set itself on the long road back in 2002–03, when led by coach Pasquale Marino and key players Roberto De Zerbi and Michele Pazienza, they were promoted back to Serie C1.

After the 2003–04 season, in which they finished mid-table but with good signs for the following year, Foggia were hit with financial problems and lost the coach Marino and all the best players.

Second U.S. Foggia

The news sent the fans into despair but Giuseppe Coccimiglio took over the reins of the club and gave confidence to the new club which assumed the team's historic name, Unione Sportiva Foggia, and was able to keep their place in the league, thanks to Comma 3 of the Article 52 of N.O.I.F.

After two more seasons finishing in mid-table, during which there were five coaching changes, Coccimiglio was criticised for not paying players' wages, a situation which created instability. After complex negotiations, the company passed into the hands of a team of local entrepreneurs led by Tullio Capobianco.

The club spent the following years mid-table in C1, narrowly losing a promotion playoff in 2006–07 against Avellino which would have seen them return to Serie B. The following season, 2007–08, they again reached the playoffs, this time losing to Cremonese.

In June 2010 Pasquale Casillo, chairman and owner during the glory years of the 1990s, re-acquired the club, and reformed the old trio of Foggia heads by appointing back Zdeněk Zeman as manager and Giuseppe Pavone as director of football. However, despite impressive performances from several young and promising players who went on to play at the highest level like Lorenzo Insigne and Marco Sau, Foggia missed out on playoff qualification.

Second Foggia Calcio

After the end of the 2011–12 season, Foggia was declined to enter Lega Pro Prima Divisione and was thus was excluded from professional football.

In the summer 2012 a new company named A.C.D. Foggia Calcio was founded to continue the football history of the city of Foggia. The club restarted from Serie D thanks to Article 52 of N.O.I.F. and was immediately promoted to Lega Pro Seconda Divisione through a repechage, dropping the A.C.D. part of their denomination in the process.

Third Foggia Calcio
After the end of the 2018–19 season, Foggia was declined to enter Serie C and was thus was excluded from professional football.

In the summer 2019 a new company named Calcio Foggia 1920 was founded to continue the football history of the city of Foggia. The club restarted from Serie D thanks to Article 52 of N.O.I.F. and was soon promoted to Serie C.

Supporters
Football has always been a popular sport to follow in the city of Foggia, especially since the Zeman years. I Satanelli can also count on support from across the Province of Foggia.

The only twinning Foggia fans have is with the supporters of Cagliari and more specifically with the Sconvolts 1987 ultras. However, each group has personal friendships, notable are those with Monza, Latina and Budapest Honvéd.

93 year-old Foggia fan Nonno Ciccio has been attending matches consistently since 1937, with the exception of wartime years. Nonno is now cited as the oldest ultra in Italy and still regularly attends Foggia matches, home and away.

Current squad

Out on loan

Club officials

Board of directors

Current technical staff

Managerial history
Foggia have had many managers and trainers throughout the history of a club, in some seasons more than one manager was in charge. Here is a chronological list of them from 1923 onwards.

Honours

 Serie B
 Winners: 1990–91
 Serie C
 Winners: 1932–33, 1959–60, 1961–62, 2016–17
Serie C2
 Winners: 2002–2003
Serie D
 Winners: 2019–2020
 Coppa Italia Serie C
 Winners: 2006–07, 2015–16
 Supercoppa di Serie C
 Winners: 2017

Divisional movements

References

External links

 

 
Football clubs in Apulia
Association football clubs established in 1920
Phoenix clubs (association football)
fog
fog
fog
fog
1920 establishments in Italy
Foggia
2012 establishments in Italy
2019 establishments in Italy